A boat dolly or boat trolley, also called a launching dolly or launching trolley or simply a dolly or trolley, is a device for launching small boats into the water. It is generally smaller than a boat trailer with smaller wheels and is not suitable for towing a boat on the road.

See also
 Boat trailer
Dolly (trailer)
Flatbed trolley
 Trolley (disambiguation)

References

Sailing equipment